Marion Miloslavovich Schultz, also Marian Schultz was an asset of the New York KGB working within the immigrant community during World War II.  Schultz was a Russian-born American citizen who worked as a mechanic in the Philadelphia Naval Shipyard and was the Chair of the United Russian Committee for Aid to the Native Country (Russian War Relief) and Slavic organizations.  Schultz's cover name assigned by Soviet intelligence was 'LAVA'.

Venona
Schultz is referenced in the following Venona project decrypt:

579 KGB New York to Moscow, 28 April 1944
1661–1662 KGB New York to Moscow, 28 November 1944

References

John Earl Haynes and Harvey Klehr, Venona: Decoding Soviet Espionage in America (New Haven: Yale University Press, 1999), pg. 223.

American spies for the Soviet Union
American people in the Venona papers
Espionage in the United States
Possibly living people